Osun Babes F.C. (formerly Comfort Queens F.C. and Oyinlola Queens F.C.) is a football club based in Osogbo, Osun State. It was founded in 1995 under the military rule of Anthony Udofia. They participate in the elite division of female football league system in Nigeria. In 2016, the government denied any plan of selling the club to private investors.

History 
The club was founded as Comfort Queens F.C. in 1995. It was later renamed to FSP Obi Babes F.C.. The running of the club was terminated by year 2000. The tenure of then governor, Prince Olagunsoye Oyinlola rejuvenated female football in the state and reestablished the club as Oyinlola Queens in 2004, this was later changed to Osun Babes after the election of Governor Rauf Aregbesola in 2011.

In 2017, the club changed some of its symbols to be more representative of the identity of state.

Current squad 
Squad list for 2022 season.

Management

Notable former players 
Ayisat Yusuf
Onome Ebi
Tawa Ishola
Josephine Chukwunonye
Ukaonu Onyinye
Christy Ohiaeriaku

Honours

References

External links 
Osun Babes at the NWFL Official website

Association football clubs established in 1995
Women's football clubs in Nigeria
Nigeria Women Premier League clubs
1995 establishments in Nigeria
Osogbo
NWFL Premiership clubs